Tereza Kneblová (born 11 April 2003) is a Czech female slalom and wildwater canoeist who has competed at the international level since 2018.

She won a gold medal in the C1 team event at the 2020 European Canoe Slalom Championships in Prague.

In wildwater canoeing she finished 4th in the C2 final and 5th in the C1 final at the 2019 Wildwater Canoeing World Championships.

Her younger sister Klára is also a slalom canoeist and multiple medalist in junior championships.

World Cup individual podiums

Wildwater Canoeing

References

External links
 

2003 births
Living people
Czech female canoeists
Place of birth missing (living people)